Joseph Martin Riordan AO (27 February 193019 November 2012) was an Australian politician and briefly government minister.

Early years
Riordan was born in Sydney, raised as a Catholic, and educated at Patrician Brothers School and Marist Brother College in that city. From 1958 to 1972 he was Federal Secretary of the Federated Clerks' Union  (a stronghold of anti-Communist social democrats).

Career
Riordan was elected as the Australian Labor Party member for the House of Representatives seat of Phillip  at the 1972 election, defeating the Liberal, William Aston.  He was Minister for Housing and Construction from June 1975 until the dismissal of the Whitlam Government in November 1975.  He was defeated by the Liberals'  Jack Birney at the 1975 election.

Riordan was Senior Deputy President of the Australian Industrial Relations Commission from 1986 to 1995.  He was made an Officer of the Order of Australia (AO) in January 1995 for "service to industrial relations, to social justice and to the Community".

Death
He died on 19 November 2012, aged 82.

Personal life
He was the nephew of Darby Riordan, the Labor member of the House of Representatives for Kennedy from 1929 to 1936.

Notes

1930 births
2012 deaths
1975 Australian constitutional crisis
Australian Labor Party members of the Parliament of Australia
Members of the Australian House of Representatives for Phillip
Members of the Australian House of Representatives
Members of the Cabinet of Australia
Officers of the Order of Australia
20th-century Australian politicians